Ilgarlı is a village in the Kemah District of Erzincan Province in Turkey. The old name of the village is Poğginer.

References

Villages in Kemah District